Charlotte Gingras (born December 10, 1943) is a Canadian author living in Quebec.

She was born in Quebec City and studied teaching and the plastic arts. Gingras taught primary school, gave workshops on creativity for adults and did freelance work as a visual artist.

Her book La liberté? Connais pas received the 1999 Governor General's Award for French-language children's literature. She received the same award in 2000 for  Un été de Jade.

Selected works 
 Les Chats d'Aurélie, youth novel (1994)
 L'Ile au géant, youth novel (1995)
 Les sorts, stories (1999)
 Freihet nimmt man sich, translated into German from La liberté? Connais pas by Rosemarie Griebel-Kruip (2001)
 Emily's piano, translated from La boîte à bonheur by Susan Ouriou (2005)
 Pieces of me, translated from La liberté? Connais pas by Susan Ouriou (2009)
 Ophélie, youth novel (2008)

References 

1943 births
Living people
Governor General's Award-winning children's writers
Writers from Quebec City
Canadian children's writers in French
Canadian women children's writers